Tiffany Danielle Blackmon (born October 10, 1984) is an American sports reporter for ESPN College Football. She previously was a sports reporter at NFL Network.

Early life and education
Blackmon is the daughter of Jacqueline and former NFL linebacker and former NFL assistant coach Donald Blackmon. Blackmon has one sister Candice and one brother Donald Jr. Blackmon was a four-year starter for the North Gwinnett High School soccer team, where she was named defensive MVP and overall MVP.  Blackmon was selected All-Gwinnett County high school team. Blackmon also was selected to the All-State team. Blackmon attended Georgia State University, where she played 49 games with the soccer team.

Career
Prior to joining NFL Network, Blackmon worked as an anchor and reporter for Comcast SportsNet Houston. Blackmon was the co-host for the weekly Houston Rockets All-Access show. Blackmon also served as the host of SportsNet Reports. Blackmon also worked at the NBC affiliate KFOR-TV in Oklahoma City, where she was the reporter for the Oklahoma City Thunder of the NBA.

References

External links
 Georgia State bio

1984 births
Living people
American television reporters and correspondents